The short-headed snake-eyed skink or Peters's lidless skink (Panaspis breviceps) is a species of lidless skinks in the family Scincidae. The species is found in western Africa.

References

Panaspis
Reptiles described in 1873
Taxa named by Wilhelm Peters